Peirópolis is a rural district located in Uberaba, Brazil. It is known as a geological-paleontological site, and the location of The Paleontological Research Center Llevellyn Ivor Price, and The Dinosaur Museum, as many dinosaur fossils were discovered in the area. Peirópolis also served as limestone producer in the early 20th century.

Founded in 1992, The Paleontological Research Center became reference for paleontological studies in Brazil, developing scientific articles in partnership with several institutions. The museum possesses a collection of 1.500 fossils most of them belonging to the Upper Cretaceous.

Extinct animals found includes the Peirosaurus and the Uberabatitan.

Museum 

The exhibition of the museum comprises the geology, and paleontology of the region of Uberaba.

References 

Heritage sites in Brazil